Carretera Amarilla / Tesalónica will be an interchange station between metro services of Seville subway system, Andalusia. The station will be located in the intersection of Montesierra Av. and Tesalónica St. close to Industrial park known as Polígono Industrial Carretera Amarilla. It will be an underground interchange station between the lines 2 (named Tesalónica) and 4 (named Carretera Amarilla) of the Seville Metro. Construction work will begin in late 2011, and the station is expected to be operational during 2017.

Future services

See also
 List of Seville metro stations

References

External links 
  Official site.
  Map of Line 2 project
  Map of Line 4 project
 History, construction details and maps.

Seville Metro stations
Railway stations in Spain opened in 2017